Shit Year is a 2010 American experimental drama film written and directed by Cam Archer and starring Ellen Barkin. The film was screened at the Directors' Fortnight event of the 2010 Cannes Film Festival.

Plot
After a successful career, actress Colleen West (Ellen Barkin) decides to retire and return to a life without so much adventure in a peaceful place. It is when a large building is installed in the vicinity and breaks the calm of the place. Mrs. West, then, realizes that the serenity of before all that would not return and that her life, in reality, was an entire stage, where everything and everyone were full interpretations. Seized by dissatisfaction, Colleen begins to feel as if she has lived her life through her characters staged on stages and on screens.

Cast
Ellen Barkin as Colleen West
Luke Grimes as Harvey West
Bob Einstein as Rick
Theresa Randle as Marion
Melora Walters as Shelly
Rickie Lee Jones as Narrator

Production
According to Archer, the film was shot in Los Angeles, with additional reshoots in Santa Cruz, California.

Reception
The film has a 33% rating on Rotten Tomatoes.  Glenn Heath Jr. of Slant Magazine awarded the film three stars out of four.

Eric Kohn of IndieWire gave the film a mixed review but praised Barkin's performance.  Jay Weissberg of Variety gave a positive review and wrote that the film "stays engrossing thanks not only to Barkin’s strengths but also Archer’s compositional eye."

References

External links
 
 

American drama films
American avant-garde and experimental films
2010s avant-garde and experimental films
2010s English-language films
2010s American films